Manhasset Secondary School, also referred to as Manhasset Junior/Senior High School or simply Manhasset High School, is a six-year comprehensive public middle and high school in Manhasset, New York, on the North Shore of Long Island. The 7–12 school is the only secondary school in the Manhasset Union Free School District.

As for the 2020–21 school year, the school had a total enrollment of 1,492 students, with 144.16 classroom teachers on FTE basis) for a student-teacher ratio of 10.35:1. 114 students (7.6%) were eligible for free lunch while 9 (0.6%) were eligible for reduced-price lunch.

History

Though the Manhasset school district gained the authority to operate a high school in 1866, a high school program would not begin until the 1920–21 school year, with the first classes being taught at the Plandome Road School (already in use at that time as an elementary school); two students were graduated from the inaugural class of 1921. Manhasset students were previously authorized to study at Flushing High School or in Great Neck per inter-district agreements. After a plot near the Plandome Road School was acquired from the Thompson family in 1934, the current Manhasset High School building, a Works Progress Administration project, began construction in 1935, with the John H. Eisele Company winning the bid for the contract to execute the school's Tudor revival created by architectural firm Tooker & Marsh with associate architect Roger H. Bullard. The building's first year in use was 1935–36, while it was still under construction; students in the 9th grade and below remained at the Plandome Road School for that academic year. The new building was completed in December 1936, with a dedication ceremony taking place on November 19, 1936. A quickly-growing school population created a need for expansion, and the building has been extended multiple times, with the first new addition coming in 1941.

Geography
Manhasset High School is situated on a hill directly to the east of the opening of Manhasset Bay, in the western part of the Manhasset School District. The school is located near the Manhasset train station, Manhasset Valley Park and the site of the former Plandome Road School (now Mary Jane Davies Green).

Academics and rankings
Manhasset High School has a 98% four-year graduation rate according to 2017–2021 data, coming in significantly ahead of the New York state average of 86%. In Manhasset's cohort of student entering in 2017, 86% of students were graduated in 2021 with a Regents Diploma with Advanced Designation, 10% with a regular Regents Diploma and 1% with a Local Diploma. 2% remained enrolled for a fifth year while one student dropped out without a diploma. 26 Advanced Placement (AP) courses were offered at Manhasset in 2020–21, with 522 students sitting for 1,406 exams in that school year, including approximately 75% of 12th grade students. 94% of class of 2021 graduates enrolled in a four-year college, 3% entered a two-year college, the military or another postgraduate program, and 3% did not continue their education beyond high school. Manhasset High School was recognized as a National Blue Ribbon School in 2019.

In the U.S. News & World Report 2022 ranking of U.S. high schools, Manhasset High School was ranked 215th nationally, 24th in New York state, 35th in the New York City metropolitan area and 78th on the ranking of STEM schools. In Niche's 2022 rankings, Manhasset High School placed 69th in the ranking of best public high schools nationwide, 11th in its ranking of public high schools in New York state, 18th in the New York City metropolitan area and 4th in Nassau County.

Demographics

Athletics

Manhasset High School participates in interscholastic athletic competitions as a member of NYSPHSAA Section VIII, competing against other schools from Nassau County. School sports in Nassau County are divided into three seasons (fall, winter and spring); Manhasset High School currently competes in the following sports:

In addition to the varsity sports offered, there are two club sports, crew and ice hockey.

Manhasset was the first high school on Long Island to introduce lacrosse at the team's founding in 1932. The sport would grow in popularity in the area over the coming decades, with Long Island overtaking Maryland as the top region for high school lacrosse in the United States by the 1960s. Many top college lacrosse players have been recruited from Long Island high schools, including Manhasset. Manhasset High School's chief historical rival in lacrosse is Garden City High School, against whom Manhasset's games are termed the Woodstick Classic, of which at least one has been played each season since 1935, except in 2020 (when the season was cancelled due to the Covid-19 pandemic).

Mascot controversy

The varsity sports teams at Manhasset High School are known as the Indians. The name dates back to at least 1939, when it was used to refer to Manhasset sports teams in the Tower yearbook. In the prior edition of The Tower, the school's athletic teams are only referred to as "The Orange and Blue", an appellation also used for them in 1939 alongside "Indians". At this point in time, no visual "Indians" name or related iconography appeared on team uniforms, at least as worn in contemporary yearbooks. The 1952 yearbook does not show indications of the team name on any of the team uniforms, but features many stereotypical cartoons throughout. By 1969, a visual depiction of a Plains headdress featured on at least some of the team uniforms. The Manhasset High School class of 1997 gave as a graduation gift to the school a life-sized wooden statue of a man in a Plains headdress (in the style of a cigar store Indian), which was placed in one of the school's central corridors.

In 2001, New York State Commissioner of Education Richard P. Mills advised public schools in New York to stop using Indian mascots and team names. However, citing a desire to seek local remedies for problems before giving orders, Mills did not require any particular course of action, issuing a mere suggestion. After consultation with a local focus group, the Manhasset UFSD chose not to make any changes.

As of 2020, Manhasset teams used a mixture of an "M with a feather" logo and an "Indian head" logo, usually rendered as a color variant of the Washington Redskins logo. In 2020, a petition demanding that Manhasset cease to use the "Indians" name and mascot was created on Change.org by Manhasset resident and Manhasset High School alumna Jo Trigg, garnering over 3,000 signatures. At the request of the school district, which sought to measure input originating from local residents only, the Manhasset Justice Initiative (MJI), a local social justice activism group, created a similar petition with signing restricted to Manhasset-affiliated individuals. Montaukett activist Sadanyah FlowingWater and Shinnecock tribe member Jeremy Dennis called for the school to end its use of the "Indian" mascot. With the school facing criticism regarding its team name and mascot, then-Superintendent Vincent Butera discussed the team mascot with MJI activists as well as FlowingWater and a Navajo nation member. FlowingWater asked the district to "seriously consider" removing the mascot at that time, citing the logo's similarity with that of the Washington Redskins. Butera announced that a public hearing would be held on the issue at the October 22, 2020 school board meeting. Butera also promised that the school would abandon the Redskins-like logo in favor of the "M with a feather", saying, "The fact is the Redskin depiction is offensive, it's offensive for a number of reasons. There's much more consensus on that [than on changing the team name]. Any depiction of Indians as Redskins is offensive."

At the October 22 board meeting, also attended by speakers from the local Montaukett, Shinnecock, Ungechauk, Setalcott and Matinecock nations, Manhasset residents, students and alumni voiced their opinions on the team name and mascot. Opponents of the name and logo expressed shame and embarrassment at being associated with Manhasset High School and its athletic programs, also pointing the NCAA's decision to discontinue the use of indigenous group-related names without the approval of local tribes. A small but vocal minority of meeting participants – only five of 29 Manhasset-affiliated commentators voiced support for the mascot – pointed to the name as a point of pride and respect for Manhasset's school traditions and indigenous history, proudly identifying as a "Manhasset Indian" (even though not descended from peoples indigenous to Manhasset and its environs). Some interlocutors also pointed out the awkwardness of the use of the term "Indian" to refer to not only the indigenous peoples of the Americas (and consequently the sports teams) but also members of Manhasset's Indian-American community. Sandi Brewster-Walker, executive director of the Montaukett nation, called for use of the mascot to be put "on hold" until local community members could be educated properly on the history and customs of local indigenous peoples, pointing out that the imagery said to honor local tribes was in reality connected with nations originating from west of the Mississippi river.

On January 7, 2021, Butera announced that the Manhasset School District would act on a suggestion from Brewster-Walker and form a committee comprising students, community members and representatives from local indigenous nations to review the school's use of Native imagery and symbols. With no committee conclusions delivered five months after that announcement, a group of 35 graduating Manhasset High School seniors wrote a letter to the board of education accusing the school of covertly phasing out the old mascot without consultation with the community. By this time, in line with Butera's 2020 promise, the "Indian head" logo had been replaced by the "M with a feather" on team uniforms and in a number of locations around the school. The proponents of the Indians mascot wrote of "Rumors of a new image" corroborated by "clear changes [which] have been made around the building" and demanded the school "immediately stop proceeding with the backdoor termination of our Indian image and rather speak with the proud Manhasset community before any changes are made." Then-Athletic Director James Amen reiterated that no such change had been made, defending both the shift to the "M with a feather" logo and the retention of the "Indians" nickname: "From time to time, some of the decals on the helmets change. It’s just stylistic changes. It’s not a redskin. It’s not a red-faced Indian which I think people get upset with. I know some people object to the red face, but we don’t have that. In my mind, we treat the Indian logo with respect and dignity. I don’t see as though we’re doing anything disgraceful when you have Indians across the jersey, or you have an M with a feather." Claiming to "represent this culture with the utmost respect", the seniors also called for an "Indian Appreciation Day" dedicated to indigenous leaders teaching about their heritage. The letter's authors wrote "Manhasset is an Indian tribe. Manhasset is our home. And we are the Indians." The MJI responded in a statement that "by claiming '[they] are the Indians,' [the letter's authors] are claiming that [they] have the shared experience of the hardship the native communities faced and paying homage to a caricature that doesn’t accurately represent [those communities]."

Manhasset teams continued to use the "Indians" name (as well as uniforms in some cases reading simply "Manhasset") and "M with a feather" logo as their identity through the 2021–22 season and no announcement of any decision made by a committee to review the use of indigenous symbols and imagery has been made as of August 19, 2022. Meanwhile, in upstate New York, the Cambridge Central School District in Cambridge, New York was ordered by State Education Commissioner Betty A. Rosa to cease use of a similar "Indians" name and mascot by the end of the 2021–22 school year, as she found it inhibited a "a safe and supportive environment" for students; local opponents of the change are contesting the decision. In 2021, a bill was introduced in the New York State Legislature which would force non-Native schools with indigenous-based team names to abandon their mascot by the 2024–25 school year, but it did not receive a floor vote during the 2021–22 legislative session.

On November 17, 2022, the New York State Department of Education issued a memo prohibiting the use of Native American mascots by schools without approval from a recognized tribe and stating that any district not in compliance by the end of the 2022–23 school year may risk being found in willful violation of the Dignity for All Students Act, with penalties including the potential removal of school officers and withholding of funds.

Performing and fine arts
Students must pass at least one class in the arts in order to receive a Regents Diploma from Manhasset High School. Manhasset Secondary School has many offerings, both curricular and extracurricular, in the musical, theatrical and visual arts.

There are four separate curricular instrumental ensembles (Concert Orchestra, Symphonic Orchestra, Concert Band and Symphonic Wind Ensemble) and four curricular choral groups (Concert Choir, Symphonic Choir, Women's Choir and Men's Choir), as well as keyboard and music theory classes on offer. In addition, Manhasset has five extracurricular vocal ensembles: Vocal Jazz Ensemble, Select Ensemble, Kinsmen (an extracurricular men's choir), the Long Island Sounds and the Shirley Tempos (two a cappella groups). Manhasset's musical ensembles compete and regularly win awards at NYSSMA Majors and other competitions. Manhasset music students are regularly among the selectees for NMEA All-County, NYSSMA All-State and NAfME All-Eastern and All-National honor ensembles.

The theatre program at Manhasset High School stages two major productions each school year: a fall musical and a spring straight play, as well as additional shows performed by the repertory companies and other groups. The school offers a "Theatre in Action" course for credit as well as three levels of repertory company performance courses.

In fine art, Manhasset High School offers 23 possible course options, including AP Studio Art and AP Art History. Manhasset's fine art classes include drawing, painting, architectural drawing, computer graphics, photography and 3D design.

Notable alumni
 Danny Barnes, former Major League Baseball (MLB) player and current coach
 Ted Bessell, actor
 Jim Brown, former National Football League (NFL) player, member of the Pro Football Hall of Fame and College Football Hall of Fame
 John C. Coffee, Adolf A. Berle Professor of Law at Columbia Law School
 John Gagliardi, former professional lacrosse player
 Nancy E. Gary, physician, government policy advisor and medical school professor and dean
 Dan Gurney, professional racecar driver
 Ken Howard, actor
 Theo Katzman, multi-instrumentalist, singer, songwriter and producer
 Barbara Prey, watercolor painter
 Stephen A. Lesser, architect who worked on the Faneuil Hall Marketplace
 Ira Sorkin, attorney, best known for defending Bernard Madoff

Notes

References

Manhasset, New York
Public high schools in New York (state)
Schools in Nassau County, New York
Public middle schools in New York (state)
1920 establishments in New York (state)